Tosi Fasinro (born 28 March 1972) is a retired British triple jumper.

He finished fourth at the 1990 World Junior Championships, won the gold medals at the 1991 European Junior Championships, the 1993 Summer Universiade and the 1994 European U23 Cup, and finished fifth at the 1995 Summer Universiade. He also competed at the 1993 World Championships without reaching the final.

Domestically, he won the 1993 UK Championships and the 1993 AAA Indoor Championships. He took one silver and one bronze at the AAA Championships. His personal best jump was 17.21 metres, achieved in July 1993 in Salamanca.

References

1972 births
Living people
British male triple jumpers
English male triple jumpers
World Athletics Championships athletes for Great Britain
Universiade medalists in athletics (track and field)
Universiade gold medalists for Great Britain
Medalists at the 1993 Summer Universiade